The Snake River Aquifer is a large reservoir of groundwater underlying the Snake River Plain in the southern part of the U.S. state of Idaho. Most of the water in the aquifer comes from irrigation recharge. The Snake River Aquifer is commonly defined as two separate parts, separated by Salmon Falls Creek: the Eastern Snake River Plain Aquifer and Western Snake River Plain Aquifer.

Eastern Snake River Plain Aquifer
The Eastern Snake River Plain Aquifer north of the Snake River is a remarkable aquifer of great resource and economic significance. It is not a single homogeneous geologic formation. Rather it consists of a volcanic pile of the Quaternary Snake River Group basalts. Interbedded alluvial sediments are also found between many of the flows.

The rivers in the ranges north of the plain all disappear into the surface of the Snake River Plain near the mountain front. The Little Lost River is a typical example. This is the well-known Thousand Springs area.

Groundwater flows to the southwest through the Snake River Plains aquifer which is consistent with the overall tilt to the southwest of the basalt strata. The channel of the Snake River cuts through the aquifer. Consequently, the gravity and weight of the water in the basalt layers north of the river drives the huge springs.

References

Aquifers in the United States
Snake River
Bodies of water of Idaho